A governor is an official, usually acting as the executive of a non-sovereign level of government.

Governor may also refer to:

Leadership
 Governor (China), the head of government of a province
 Governor (Japan), the highest ranking executive of a prefecture
 Governor (Russia), the chief executive of a federal subject of Russia
 Governor (Turkey), the official responsible for government decisions in a province
 Governor (United States), the head of state and head of government of a US state
 Governor (Les Invalides, France), a French military office

Arts and entertainment
 The Governor (1939 film), a German film directed by Viktor Tourjansky
 The Governor (2009 film), a 2009 Turkish film
 The Governor (2016 film), a 2016 Nigerian, Nollywood film
 The Governor (New Zealand TV series), a New Zealand television miniseries about Sir George Grey
 The Governor (British TV series), a British television series
 The Governor (The Walking Dead), a fictional character in The Walking Dead comic book series and television series
 "Governor", a song from the 1996 album 4am Friday by Avail

People
 Governor (singer), American recording artist Governor Washington Jr (born 1983)
 The Governor (wrestler), a ring name of American retired professional wrestler Shannon Spruill (born 1975)

Other uses
 Governor (device), a device that regulates the speed of a machine
 Governor (linguistics), a type of syntactic object that has the potential to govern another
 Smith & Wesson Governor, a snubnosed revolver that fires .45 Colt, 2.5" .410 bore ammo, and moon-clipped .45 ACP

See also
 Centrifugal governor, a type of governor that regulates fuel intake to an engine
 Governors State University, a public university in University Park, Illinois
 Jiedushi, military governors in 8th- to 11th-century imperial China
 School governor, a voluntary role in state schools of England, Wales and Northern Ireland
 Governor Island (disambiguation)
 The Guv'nor (disambiguation)